Rhopalomyia solidaginis, the goldenrod bunch gall, is a species of gall midges, insects in the family Cecidomyiidae.

References

Further reading

 

 Bugguide.net. Species Rhopalomyia solidaginis - Goldenrod Bunch Gall

External links

 

Cecidomyiinae
Articles created by Qbugbot
Insects described in 1862

Gall-inducing insects
Diptera of North America